Great Hill Place, also known as Colaparchee and Cotton Place, in Monroe County, Georgia, west of Bolingbroke, Georgia, was listed on the National Register of Historic Places in 1973.

The plantation complex, in 1973, included a two-story main house.  The house, then known as Cotton Place, was enlarged and "Victorianized" in 1874-75 by railroad businessman William Morrill Wadley to retire there.  The original house, built in the early 1800s, was plantation plain in style. Subsequent owners called it Colaparchee, before Wadley bought it in 1873. He named it "Great Hill" after his birthplace near Brentwood, New Hampshire. The plantation, then , cost $6,410. Wadley was buried beside the house, in the Wadley family cemetery, after his death in 1882. His wife, Rebecca, joined him in 1905.

It was deemed significant as "one of few, almost perfectly intact plantation complexes" in the state of Georgia.

Some portion of the estate, perhaps the main house, has been lost (see photo from 2014).  Satellite view of the property, in 2019, shows a large, presumably new mansion, covering where the main house was.  A number of historic outbuildings survive.

It is about 1/2 mile off Georgia State Route 41, a short way from the intersection of Route 41 and Interstate 475.

Coordinates  point to what appears to have been the dairy  of the plantation complex, based on comparison of sketch map to Google satellite view.

References

Plantations in Georgia (U.S. state)
National Register of Historic Places in Monroe County, Georgia
Italianate architecture in Georgia (U.S. state)
Buildings and structures completed in 1875